Lev Yashin. The Goalee of My Dreams is a 2019 Russian biographical sports drama film, unfolded in the historical period of the 50s and 60s of the USSR, telling the audience about the legend of the Soviet Union national football team.

The project was directed by Vasiliy Chiginskiy, and the script was written by Aleksandr Polozov and produced by Oleg Kapanets about the life of the famous Soviet football goalkeeper Lev Yashin, where most of the characters are real people.
The film stars Aleksandr Fokin as Yashin, with Yulia Khlynina, Aleksei Guskov, and Aleksei Kravchenko.

The film was theatrically released in Russia on November 28, 2019, by Megogo Distribution.

Plot 
The film tells about the legendary goalkeeper Lev Yashin, thanks to which the USSR team in the mid-20th century won the most significant football awards.

May 27, 1971. Moscow, waiting for the farewell match of football goalkeeper Lev Yashin. For the first time in the history of the Soviet football player, all the stars of world football will be honored.

In anticipation of this event, Lev Yashin recalls the people and the matches with which his career was associated – and the ridiculous goal conceded in the first match for the main Dynamo squad, after which he sat on the bench for 2 years; and hard training, returning him to the main team; and speaking for the Soviet Union national football team at the 1960 European Nations' Cup; and failure at the 1962 FIFA World Cup in Chile, which could put an end to his career; and the match for the world team on October 23, 1963, in London.

Cast

Production

Filming
The production began in 2014, in collaboration between members of the Russian Ministry of Culture and the Dynamo Sports Club Association. The filming was done in Moscow and its suburbs in collaboration with the VTB Bank and FC Dynamo Moscow. About the film's oversight work was Amon Sergei Stepashin, the former Russian interior minister, who wanted to make sure to produce a biographical film about the life of the renowned doorman.

The film received approval and support from veterans of domestic sports, partners of Lev Yashin in games for the club and the USSR national team, from the goalkeeper's family and numerous Dynamo fans.

Release
Premiere of the film Lev Yashin. The Goalee of My Dreams was held in Moscow at the October cinema center on November 25, 2019, and was theatrically released in the Russian Federation on November 28, 2019, by Megogo Distribution. The television premiere of the film took place on June 12, 2020, Russia Day with a celebration on Channel One.

See also
 Legend No. 17, a Russian biographical sports drama film
 Going Vertical (2017 film), a Russian sports drama film

References

External links 
 

2019 films
2010s Russian-language films
2019 biographical drama films
2010s sports drama films
Russian biographical drama films
Russian sports drama films
Russian association football films
Sports films based on actual events
Drama films based on actual events
Biographical films about sportspeople
Films scored by George Kallis
Films set in Moscow
Films set in the Soviet Union
2019 drama films